Richard Johnson Anglican School is a dual-campus independent Anglican co-educational  early learning, primary and secondary day school, located in western Sydney, New South Wales, Australia. Founded in 1997, the school provides a religious and general education to approximately 950 students from early learning, through Year K to Year 12 at campuses located in Oakhurst and Marsden Park.

Oversight of the school is administered by the Sydney Anglican Schools Corporation and the school is affiliated with the Diocese of Sydney. The school is named after Richard Johnson, the first clergyman in Australia.

In 2016, the school opened its Marsden Park campus that is planned to be of equivalent size or larger than the Oakhurst campus.

In 2020, founding Principal Paul Cockrem retired. He was succeeded by Deputy Principal Alan Dawson.

See also 

 List of Anglican schools in New South Wales
 Anglican education in Australia

References

External links

Anglican primary schools in Sydney
Anglican secondary schools in Sydney
Educational institutions established in 1997
1997 establishments in Australia
Anglican Diocese of Sydney
City of Blacktown